Ostorhinchus moluccensis, commonly known as Moluccan cardinalfish, is a marine fish native to the Indian and Pacific Oceans.

References

External links
 

Fish of Thailand
Fish described in 1832
Fish of the Pacific Ocean
Fish of the Indian Ocean
moluccensis